, occasionally Chūdan-gamae, or simply Chūdan as it is shortened to in many Japanese martial arts schools that instruct in the use of the katana (sword).  Chūdan-no-kamae translates to "middle-level posture", it is also called Seigan-no-kamae (正眼之構) that can be translated to "right posture".  In most traditional schools of swordsmanship, and in the practice of kendo, chūdan-no-kamae is the most basic posture.  It provides a balance between attacking and defensive techniques.

Kendo
Chūdan-no-kamae is one of the five stances in kendo: jōdan, chūdan, gedan, hassō and waki.

This is the most basic stance in kendo which balances attack and defence.  If correctly assumed, the trunk (do) and right wrist (migi-kote) are hidden from the opponent.  The throat is visible, but the extended tip of the sword threatens a thrusting enemy with a likely counter-thrust.  The head (men) is the only clearly open target, but this too is easily defended.  If the kamae is not broken, the user can step into striking distance of the opponent whilst maintaining good defence.

A beginner learns this stance first in order to learn the correct striking distance, issoku-ittō-no-maai (一足一刀の間合い).

Body position
In chūdan-no-kamae, the left foot is slightly behind the right with the left heel slightly raised, both feet are parallel, the hips are straight forward, shoulders are relaxed, spine is perpendicular to the floor at all times. The center of gravity should be centered between both feet.

The shinai is held with the hands in front of the waist, with the tip of the weapon pointed at the opponent's throat.

Kenjutsu, generally
Traditional styles of kenjutsu also use this as a basic stance, the only variation being the footwork.  Generally, a much more grounded base is required for proper cutting with power, stability, and focus.  Some traditional styles may even assume zenkutsu dachi for their footwork.

In contrast, and for example, the kenjutsu taught in the practice of aikido opts for a middle ground, where chūdan-no-kamae is assumed with the body otherwise in hanmi-dachi.  The purpose is to reduce the possibility of an ai-uchi (simultaneous strike, usually resulting in mutual death), which often occurs harmlessly in kendo (whoever the judges believe struck the earliest gets the points), but is generally undesirable in actual combat.

Other kamae (positions)
Some other kamae are:
Gedan-no-kamae
Jōdan-no-kamae
Hassō-no-kamae
Waki-gamae

All of them have a hidari (左) left and migi (右) right version. When indicated, hidari or migi will be prefixed to the stance, e.g. migi gedan-no-kamae would be 右下段の構え.

These are the most standard kamae, and the most widely practiced.  Others exist, and as one extreme example, the art of Tenshin Shōden Katori Shintō-ryū  practices all of these and at least twice as many others, almost none of which actually use the above names.

The five kamae are called fire (jōdan), water (chūdan), earth (gedan), wood (hassō) and metal (waki) according to the Five Elements. Alternately, in Yagyu Shinkage, they are referred to as heaven (jōdan), man (chūdan), shadow (hassō), and light (waki), with earth (gedan) being mutually shared.

European schools of swordsmanship

This posture is known as Eisenport or Iron Gate in German martial arts from the 14th through 16th century.

This posture is most similar to Posta di Breve or Short Guard in Italian martial arts from the 14th through 16th century. In the late 1500s Camillo Agrippa renamed it to Terza or Third. Agrippa's numeric naming conventions were widely adopted by the start of the 17th century.

References

Kendo stances